Rob Cote (born July 5, 1986, in Calgary, Alberta) is a retired Canadian football fullback, who played 10 years for the Calgary Stampeders of the Canadian Football League. He was originally signed by the Calgary Stampeders as an undrafted free agent in 2007. He also played in the Canadian Junior Football for the Victoria Rebels.

Cote attends the University of Calgary in the off-season but had never played CIS football.

Early years
Cote grew up in Cochrane, Alberta and played for the Cochrane High School Cobras football team.

Professional career
On February 18, 2017 it was announced that Cote re-signed with the Calgary Stampeders on a one year deal.

Cote announced his retirement from professional football on January 23, 2018.

Career statistics

References

External links
Calgary Stampeders bio

1986 births
Living people
Calgary Stampeders players
Canadian football fullbacks
Canadian football people from Calgary
Players of Canadian football from Alberta
People from Cochrane, Alberta
Canadian Junior Football League players